A child marriage is a marriage in which at least one party is under 18 years of age -- or the age of majority --  in the U.S. 

Within the United States, each state, territory and federal district sets the marriage age in its jurisdiction. As of March 2023, in seven states there is no statutory minimum age when all exemptions were taken into account. These states are California, Michigan, Mississippi, New Mexico, Oklahoma, Washington, and West Virginia. 

As of March 2023, seven states have banned underage marriages, with no exception: New Jersey (2018), Delaware (2018), Pennsylvania (2020), Minnesota (2020), Rhode Island (2021), New York (2021), and Massachusetts (2022). American Samoa and the U.S. Virgin Islands, United States territories, have also ended child marriage in that time. Several other U.S. states have similar legislation pending.

Between 2000 and 2018, some 300,000 minors were legally married in the United States. The vast majority of child marriages (reliable sources vary between 78% and 95%) were between a minor girl and an adult man. In many cases, minors in the U.S. may be married when they are under the age of sexual consent, which varies from 16 to 18 depending on the state. In some states, minors cannot legally divorce or leave their spouse, and domestic violence shelters typically do not accept minors.

Historically, child marriage has been a culturally acceptable practice, but today it is increasingly viewed as a form of child sexual abuse. Some international agencies, including the U.S. State Department, have declared it a human rights violation. Some researchers have concluded that there are consequences to child marriages; along with the threat of sexual abuse, children may be subject to decreased education, early pregnancies, and psychological trauma.

Background

History 
In ancient and medieval civilizations, it was a regular practice to give girls away in marriage as soon as they reached puberty, if not earlier. This practice continued throughout the Middle Ages and most girls were married by age fifteen. Ruth Lamden in her book A Separate People: Jewish Women in Palestine, Syria, and Egypt in the sixteenth Century, notes that it is important to realize that cultural customs contribute to the perception of appropriate marriage age. She details that in those times, according to Jewish law, girls were considered adults by the time they were twelve and a half. In Antebellum American culture, marriages between older men and younger women were not viewed in the same way they are today. Although the practice was not extremely common, it was not counter cultural either. Marriage was viewed more as a contract, and the minors to be wedded, typically girls, were thought of as going from the responsibility of one man, the father, to the other man, the husband.

Causes 
There is no singular justification for child marriage. Some marry in accordance with religious or cultural traditions. Others do so to avoid legal ramifications of sexual activities with minors. Traditionally, specifically in developing nations, one of the most common reasons for child marriage was avoiding negative stigmas associated with premarital sex and teen pregnancy. By arranging the marriage of minors, typically girls and boys or men who have been involved in sex before marriage, the families seek to save face and maintain respect within the community.

Demographics 
In 2018, Alissa Koski and Jody Heymann, two researchers from the University of California Los Angeles, compiled a study detailing the prevalence of child marriage in the U.S. and common characteristics of those unions. The findings were published in their article "Child Marriage in the United States: How Common Is the Practice, And Which Children Are at Greatest Risk?: Child marriage in the United States". They found that out of every 1,000 children surveyed, about 6 were married.  Prevalence varied by location, race/ethnicity, gender and age.

Unchained At Last, an organization dedicated to ending forced and child marriage in the United States, found marriage licenses for 232,474 children between 2000 and 2018. Based on the correlation between population and incidence of child marriage, they estimated that the actual number of child marriages in the U.S. during that time was closer to 300,000.

Sex 
Young females are more likely to be married than young males.  According to statistics released by the Pew Research Center (based upon the American Community Survey), 55% of the surveyed married children at ages of 15–17 were female. According to a Frontline article, 87% of the total minors who got married in 2000-2015 were girls. Koski and Heymann found child marriage was higher among girls than among boys (6.8 vs. 5.7 per 1,000, or a ~19% difference). Most of the available statistics and literature on child marriages examine female minors as opposed to male minors. According to Unchained At Last's study, some 86% of the children who married in the U.S. between 2000 and 2018 were girls – and most were wed to adult men an average of four years older.

Location 
According to information compiled by the Pew Research Center, child marriage is generally more common in some of the Southern United States.

The highest rates of child marriages are in West Virginia, Florida, Texas, Nevada, Oklahoma, Arkansas, California, Tennessee, and North Carolina. According to a Frontline report by Anjali Tsui, Dan Nolan and Chris Amico, the states with the highest rates of child marriage in 2010 were: Idaho, Utah, Arizona, Texas, Mississippi, Alabama, Arkansas, Kentucky, West Virginia and Missouri. The states with the lowest rates were Delaware, New Jersey, Montana, Indiana, North Dakota, Ohio, New York, Vermont, New Hampshire and Massachusetts.

Unchained At Last found that the ten states with the highest rate of child marriage per capita between 2000 and 2018 were:

 Nevada (0.671%)
 Idaho (0.338%)
 Arkansas (0.295%)
 Kentucky (0.262%)
 Oklahoma (0.229%)
 Wyoming (0.227%)
 Utah (0.208%)
 Alabama (0.195%)
 West Virginia (0.193%)
 Mississippi (0.182%)

The Koski/Heymann study found prevalence of child marriage varied from more than 10 per 1,000 in West Virginia, Hawaii and North Dakota to less than four per 1,000 in Maine, Rhode Island and Wyoming.

 In Texas from 2000 to 2014, almost 40,000 children were married.
 In Florida, 16,400 children, some as young as 13, were married from 2000–2017, which is the second highest incidence of child marriage after Texas.
 In Alabama there were over 8,600 child marriages from 2000 to 2015, the fourth highest amount of any state. However, child marriage in Alabama showed a large decline in that time. In 2000, almost 1,200 children married, but by 2014 it dropped to 190. 
In Virginia between 2004 and 2013, nearly 4,500 children were married according to the Tahirih Justice Center.
 In Ohio from 2000 to 2015 there were 4,443 girls married aged 17 and younger, including 43 aged 15 and under.
 In New York, more than 3,800 children were married between 2000 and 2010.

The Koski/Heymann also found that only 20% of married children were living with their spouses; the majority of the rest were living with their parents.

Race/ethnicity 
Cases of child marriage exist in every racial or ethnic demographic but are more prevalent in some as compared to others. Instances of marriage were lower among white non-Hispanic children (5.0 per 1,000) than among almost every other racial or ethnic group studied; it was especially high among children of Native American or Chinese descent (10.3 and 14.2, respectively) Additionally, U.S.-born African American girls are about 1.5 times more likely to marry underage than U.S.-born Caucasian girls. Girls of Hispanic/Latina origin are more likely than those of black or white heritage to be married as a minor.

It was more common for immigrating children to be married than those born within the United States. Between the budget years 2007 and 2017, U.S. Citizenship and Immigration Services received 3.5 million immigration petitions, resulting in 8,686 approvals for people in marriages or engagements where one or both members of the couple was still a minor at the time of the petition. The Koski/Heymann study found that prevalence among children from Mexico, Central America, and the Middle East was 2-4 times that of children born in the United States.

Marriage age 

The marriageable age is determined by each state and territory.

Unchained At Last, a non-profit advocacy group dedicated to ending child marriage in the United States, found that only 14% of the child marriages conducted from 2000 to 2010 were between two children marrying each other. In the other 86% of cases, child marriages are between a minor and an adult. In terms of spousal age, the majority of those surveyed, about 60%, reported being 18–20 years old. Less than 3% reported being over 29 years of age. In over 400 cases, the adult was aged over 40. And in 31 cases, they were over 60.

According to data compiled by Anjali Tsui, Dan Nolan, and Chris Amico, who looked at almost 200,000 cases of child marriage from 2000-2015:

 67% of the children were aged 17.
 29% of the children were aged 16.
 4% of the children were aged 15.
 Less than 1% of the children were aged 14 and under.
 There were 51 cases of 13-year-olds getting married, and 6 cases of 12-year-olds getting married.

Extreme examples include a case in 2010 in Idaho, where a 65-year-old man married a 17-year-old girl. In Alabama, a 74-year-old man married a 14-year-old girl, though the state has since raised its minimum age to 16. According to Unchained At Last, the youngest girls to marry in 2000–2010 were three 10-year-old girls in Tennessee who married men aged 24, 25, and 31 in 2001. The youngest boy to marry was an 11-year-old, also in Tennessee, who married a 27-year-old woman in 2006.

U.S. states

Every state except New York, Rhode Island, Pennsylvania, Delaware, Minnesota, New Jersey, and Massachusetts allows underage marriage in exceptional circumstances if one or more of the following circumstances apply:

 consent of a court clerk or judge (sometimes the consent of a superior court judge, rather than a local judge, is required)
 consent of the parents or legal guardians of the minor
 if one of the parties is pregnant
 if the minor has given birth to a child
 if the minor is emancipated.

In California, for instance, the general marriage age is 18, but children may be married with parental consent and judicial approval with no minimum age limit.

, in the 43 states that have set a marriage age by statute, the lower minimum marriage age when all exceptions are taken into account, are:

 7 states have no minimum age (effectively 0).
 2 states have a minimum age of 15.
 25 states have a minimum age of 16.
 9 states have a minimum age of 17.
 7 states have a minimum age of 18.

From 2017 to 2023, several states changed their law to set a minimum age, to raise their minimum age, or to make more stringent the conditions under which an underage marriage may occur. In the absence of any statutory minimum age, some conclude that the minimum common law marriageable age of 12 for girls and 14 for boys may still apply.

U.S. territories
In the District of Columbia the general marriage age is 18, but 16-year-olds may marry with exceptions. The general age of marriage in Puerto Rico is 21, however, 18-year-olds can marry, with exceptions (the age of majority in Puerto Rico is 21). In Guam, the general age is 18, but 16-year-olds can get married with the consent of at least one parent or guardian. In American Samoa, the marriage age has been changed to 18 for both sexes. This reflects a change in policy by Governor Lolo Moliga, who signed into law a bill that changed the marriage age for girls from 14 to 18 in September 2018.  In the U.S. Virgin Islands, the age of marriage is 18 for both sexes. Prior to 2019, the age of marriage was 14 for females and 16 for males. In the Northern Mariana Islands males must be 18 to marry, while females can marry at 16 with parental consent.

Comparison with other countries
Critics have pointed out that laws regarding child marriage in the United States compare unfavorably to laws regarding child marriage in other countries. For instance, in 2017, Human Rights Watch pointed out that Afghanistan has a tougher law on child marriage than parts of the United States: in Afghanistan the minimum age of marriage is 15, and that only with permission from their father or a judge; otherwise it is 16. As of that date, 25 U.S. states had no minimum marriage age at all if one or more of the grounds for exception existed; this number has continually decreased since then.

Legal status

Underage marriage and sexual consent 

In the United States, the age of sexual consent varies by state, territory/district, or federal law, and typically ranges from 16 to 18 years.

State-legislated age of consent laws and marriage age laws are inconsistent in relation to one another. In some states, it is possible for a minor to legally marry even if they are below the age of consent in that state. Between 2000 and 2018, nearly 300,000 minors were legally married in the United States. Some 60,000 of those occurred at an age or spousal age difference that should have been considered a sex crime. In about 88% of those marriages, the marriage license became a “get out of jail free” card for a would-be rapist under state law that specifically allowed within marriage what would otherwise be considered statutory rape. In the other 12% of those marriages, the state sent a child home to be raped. The marriage was legal under state law, but sex within the marriage was a crime.

In some cases, judges who approve an underage marriage, for example because the minor is pregnant, may be approving a marriage between a rapist and their statutory victim.

Emancipation by marriage 

In some states, marriage automatically emancipates a minor or increases his or her legal rights beyond allowing the minor to consent to certain medical treatments. Emancipated minors are theoretically considered adults, so that they may be able to file for a restraining order, get a divorce, and benefit from social services in certain states, though these laws are not universal. However, in practice such minors may still encounter difficulties, as many institutions do not deal with minors, or require parental consent.

In some states, a minor is not emancipated by marriage, and legal proceedings are required to obtain an emancipation decree. The absence of emancipation may result in legal complications, if, for example, the minor wants to separate from their partner or wants a divorce. They may have to wait years before emancipation in order to reach adult age. Those non-emancipated married minors may find themselves locked into a marriage, unable to leave or divorce an abusive spouse. 70%-80% of underage marriages end in divorce, but many minors locked in a marriage must wait years until they are old enough to legally end the marriage.

Consequences  
According to researchers such as Camellia Burris and Anju Malhotra, there can be many repercussions that affect minors who have been married. Common ones include a greater risk for sexual misconduct/abuse, psychological trauma, risk of death or injury in childbirth, and a likelihood to drop out of school.

Forced marriage and sex trafficking

In some cases, child marriage may (either legally or informally) constitute a forced marriage, often in the context of sex trafficking. This enables sexual abuse to continue. According to American Child Bride by Nicholas Syrett, "There is a long history in the United States of marriage laws being used to circumvent legal repercussions of sexual activity with a minor". Due to the way many U.S. marriage policies are written, finding loopholes is a possibility that has been exploited before. Additionally, women who have suffered sexual abuse are more likely to be revictimized in the future.

Psychological health 
There are many effects that child marriages generally, and child abuse specifically, can have on an individual. The most common is the propensity for encountering abuse later on in life. According to data collected in 2015 by Jon D. Elhai, women who experienced traumatic events as children often experience mental health issues such as depression, anxiety, and mood disorders, as well as low self-esteem. A correlation between childhood sexual abuse and substance abuse has also been found.

Physical health 
Adverse physical effects often accompany child marriages. The most prevalent is pregnancy and childbearing complications. The body is not fully matured under the age of 18, so minors who become pregnant often face complications that are not as common in their older counterparts.

UNICEF reported in 2007 that globally, a girl aged 15 is five times more likely to die in childbirth than women in their 20s.  Young mothers also have an increased risk of developing obstetric fistula.

Education 
The loss of educational opportunity and influence is of particular importance to those opposed to child marriages. According to academics such as Martha Nussbaum, education is a crucial component to protecting one's freedom or capabilities. This in turn limits their autonomy and job eligibility, making them dependent on their spouse or caretaker.

Prevention

Federal law
There is not much federal legislation concerning child marriages. In 2013, the Violence Against Women Reauthorization Act mandated that the U.S. Secretary of State must "establish and implement a multi-year, multi-sectoral strategy to end child marriage".

U.S. territories and states 
As of March 2023, 43 states have set absolute minimum marriage ages by statute, which vary between 14 and 18 years of age. In recent years, several states have increased their marriage age, including, in 2020, Idaho, Indiana, and Minnesota. For more details on the marriage age by state, see Marriage age in the United States.

American Samoa

In September 2018, American Samoa raised the marriage age for girls from 14 to 18, to be in line with that of boys.

Alabama

In 2003, Alabama raised the minimum marriage age (with exceptions) from 14 to 16.

Arizona

In April 2018, Arizona raised the minimum marriage age to 16. Such underage marriages must be approved by a superior court, must have either parental consent or an emancipated minor, and the age difference between the parties must not be more than 3 years.

Arkansas

In April 2019, Arkansas raised the minimum marriage age for girls from 16 to 17 with parental consent, to be in line with that of boys. Previously, there was no minimum age for a pregnant girl to marry.

California

In California in 2017, a bill that would have ended child marriage (by raising the minimum age to 18) ran into opposition from legislators, the American Civil Liberties Union and Planned Parenthood.

Since January 1, 2019, California legally requires the parents and partners of minors wishing to marry to meet with court officials separately, to determine if there is any coercion. Additionally, minors have to wait 30 days to get married, unless they are 17 and have completed high school, or one of the partners is pregnant. However, there is still no minimum age for children to marry, if these conditions are met.

Connecticut

On October 1, 2017, Connecticut raised the minimum marriage age to 16, as well as requiring both parental and judicial consent before minors could marry. Previously, there was no minimum marriage age so long as a judge consented.

Delaware

In May 2018, Delaware became the first state to completely ban child marriage. The marriage age in Delaware is now 18, with no exceptions.

Florida

In early 2018, Florida passed and signed a law to amend its marriage laws, after having received intense media attention for its lax child marriage laws and the high toleration of the practice. Since July 1, 2018, the minimum marriage age is 17, with both parental and judicial approval required, and the age difference between the parties must not be more than 2 years. The new law was passed after sustained lobbying from a former survivor of child marriage, Sherry Johnson.

Georgia

In May 2019, Georgia raised the marriage age explicitly from 16 to 17. They must be emancipated minors, must have completed a premarital education course, and cannot marry anyone more than four years older than themselves. The new law went into effect on July 1, 2019.

Idaho

In February 2019, a bipartisan anti-child marriage bill was voted down 39-28 by the Idaho House of Representatives. The bill would have made it illegal for anyone under 16 to get married, and for 16- and 17-year-olds it would have required the consent of parents, a judge, and the minor themselves. Idaho now has one of the highest rates of child marriage in the United States.

Representatives Bryan Zollinger and Julianne Young voted against, citing their opinion that judges should not be involved in marriages, and that parental consent was sufficient. Representative Christy Zito complained that the bill would make it harder for people to start families if they conceive a child underage, compared to abortion.

In 2020, similar legislation passed. The minimum age for marriage in Idaho is currently 16 with parental consent and no more than a three-year age difference between the marrying parties.

Kentucky

In March 2018, Kentucky amended its marriage laws. After several failed attempts at restricting child marriage, a redrafted bill was introduced, passed all stages of the Kentucky Legislature, and was signed by the Governor of Kentucky on March 29, 2018. The new law sets a minimum age of 17, with judicial approval. Additionally, a 17-year-old cannot marry a person more than 4 years older than themselves, they must have completed high school or obtained an equivalent degree such as a GED, and must prove that they are able to take care of themselves.

Massachusetts

In July 2022, Massachusetts Governor Baker signed into law a bill raising the minimum age of marriage in all cases to the age of 18, with no exceptions made for parental or judicial consent, making Massachusetts the seventh state to end child marriage. The ban was included in section 80 of the FY2023 budget bill.

Minnesota

In May 2020, Minnesota became the fourth state to ban child marriage.

Missouri

In July 2018 Missouri raised the minimum age for marriage from 15 to 16. Parental permission is required.

North Carolina

A 2021 bill raised the minimum age for marriage from 14 to 16. Additionally, under this bill, the spouse of a 16-year-old could be no more than four years older.

New Jersey

In June 2018, the New Jersey child marriage ban bill was signed into law by the Governor of New Jersey, Phil Murphy, and went into effect immediately to implement a clear minimum age of 18, with no exceptions. This makes New Jersey the second state to completely ban child marriage, after Delaware.

In May 2017, a similar bill was vetoed by Governor Chris Christie due to "religious concerns".

New Hampshire

New Hampshire passed a law which was signed by Governor Chris Sununu in 2018 that legally raising the minimum marriage age to 16 with judicial approval. It came into effect January 1, 2019.

New York

In July 2021, New York became the sixth state to ban child marriage.

In 2017, New York state raised the marriage age to 18, but allowed marriage at 17 in special circumstances with parental and court consent. Prior to this law, the state allowed marriage in certain cases from the age of 14.

Ohio

In 2019, Ohio raised the minimum marriage age to 18 for both parties, but allowed an exemption for 17-year-olds to marry if they have juvenile court consent, go through a 14-day waiting period, and the age difference between the parties is not more than four years.

Pennsylvania

In May 2020, Pennsylvania became the third state to ban child marriage. The marriage age is 18.

Rhode Island

In June 2021, Rhode Island became the fifth state to ban child marriage. The marriage age is 18, no exceptions.

Tennessee

In Tennessee, before 2018, there was no minimum marriage age with judicial consent. In March 2018, a proposed bill to end child marriage in Tennessee was terminated. The bill was revived due to political pressure, passed, and signed into law in May 2018 by Governor Haslam, preventing anyone younger than 17 from marrying in Tennessee.

Texas

In 2017, Texas raised the marriage age to 18; however, they kept an exception allowing emancipated minors aged 16–17 to marry.

Utah

On March 25, 2019, the Governor of Utah, Gary Herbert, signed a law which raised the minimum marriage age from 15 to 16, with parental permission. The law also makes it illegal for a 16- or 17-year-old to marry someone who is more than 7 years older than them. The law passed the Utah House of Representatives 55 to 6, with 14 abstentions. It was described as a bipartisan effort, with a majority of Republicans, and all Democrats, voting in favor.

Virginia

In 2016, Virginia changed the law to set 18 as a minimum age, and 16 in special circumstances with judicial approval. Prior to the passing of that bill, there was no minimum age in the state.

Non-governmental action 

 Released in 2016, the US Global Strategy to Empower Adolescent Girls lists reducing child, early and forced marriage as a vital goal.
The United Nations' Sustainable Development Goal 5.3 includes ending child marriage globally by the year 2030.
Unchained At Last, an advocacy and social services agency in the United States, is working to end child marriage in the USA.

See also 
 Age of consent in the United States
 Age of majority
 Age of marriage in the United States
 Age of sexual consent
 Forced marriage
 Marriageable age
 Minor (law)
 Parental consent
 Sex trafficking in the United States
 Slavery in the 21st century

References